Nemapogon koenigi is a moth of the family Tineidae. It is found in most of Europe, except Ireland, Belgium, the Iberian Peninsula, Ukraine, Greece and probably most of the Balkan Peninsula.

The wingspan is 9–14 mm.

The larvae feed on fungi and dead and decaying wood.

References

Moths described in 1967
Nemapogoninae